Pierre Andries Tendean (21 February 1939 – 1 October 1965) was an Indonesian Army lieutenant. He was best known as a victim of the 30th September Movement (G30S) and posthumously awarded as revolution hero, later Indonesian national hero.

Early life
Tendean was the a second child of three children of A.L. Tendean from Minahasa and  Dutch-born French mother M.E. Cornet. He had an older sister, Mitzi, and younger sister, Rooswidiati. Tendean's father was a doctor and held posts in hospitals in Jakarta, Tasikmalaya, Cisarua, Magelang, and Semarang. Tendean attended elementary school in Magelang and middle school and high school in Semarang. His desire after completing high school was to attend the National Military Academy. However, his parents wanted him to become a doctor like his father or an engineer. The compromise was for Pierre to attend the Army's Engineering Academy in Bandung, where he started in 1958.

Military career
Tendean received battlefield experience while in the academy when he was sent to West Sumatra with his fellow cadets to participate in operation Sapta Marga against the Revolutionary Government of the Republic of Indonesia (PRRI). At that time Tendean was a Corporal Cadet and was assigned to the Army's Corps of Engineers. In 1961, Tendean graduated from ATEKAD and was given the rank Second Lieutenant. As a fresh Zeni officer, he then pursued a year-long course in military-civil engineering in the same academy and finished the course in December 1962. His first assignment after Academy was as Platoon Commander in the 2nd Battalion of the Corps of Engineers in the 2nd Regional Military Command (Indonesian: Komandan Peleton Batalyon Zeni Tempur 2 Komando Daerah Militer II (Danton Yon Zipur 2 / Dam II) ) in Medan.

The following year, Tendean received intelligence training in Army Intelligence Training Centre in Bogor and was subsequently assigned to the Army Central Intelligence Service. He was sent to the front lines during operation Dwikora, Indonesia's confrontation with Malaysia, where he led a group of volunteers in several infiltrations into Malaysia performing intelligence gathering. On April 15, 1965, Tendean was promoted to First Lieutenant and later, was assigned as a personal aide to General Abdul Haris Nasution.

30th September Movement

In the early morning hours of October 1, 1965, troops loyal to the 30 September Movement  (G30S) came to Nasution's house with the intention of kidnapping him. Shots were fired, awakening Tendean who was staying in the general's housing complex. He was apprehended by the troops and was mistaken for Nasution in the darkened villa. Nasution himself was able to escape in the confusion.

Tendean was brought to Lubang Buaya along with six high-ranking officers of the army. He was shot to death, and his body thrown into an old well with those of the other captives. His body was among those recovered from the well just three days later.

On 5 October 1965, President Sukarno named Pierre Tendean a national hero for his dedication and sacrifice to the nation. He was posthumously promoted to the rank of Captain and buried in the Kalibata Heroes Cemetery. The second youngest of the 8 who were killed in Jakarta, he was only 26 years old at the time of his murder.

References

Bibliography

 
 

1939 births
1965 deaths
Indonesian Christians
People from Jakarta
Indo people
Minahasa people
National Heroes of Indonesia
Indonesian people of French descent